The Duchess of Benameji (Spanish:La duquesa de Benamejí) is a 1932 Spanish play written by the brothers Antonio and Manuel Machado. In 1949 the play was turned into a large budget film The Duchess of Benameji directed by Luis Lucia Mingarro.

References

Bibliography
 Bentley, Bernard. A Companion to Spanish Cinema. Boydell & Brewer 2008.

1932 plays
Spanish plays adapted into films
Plays set in Spain
Plays set in the 19th century